Ansel Elkins is an American poet and 2014 winner of the Yale Series of Younger Poets Competition. Yale University Press published her collection Blue Yodel in 2015.

Biography 
Elkins was born and raised in northern Alabama. She received her BA from Sarah Lawrence College and an MFA from UNC Greensboro.

Elkins has also been a winner of a Discovery/Boston Review Poetry Prize and the recipient of a 2013 NEA Creative Writing fellowship.

Works 
 Blue yodel, New Haven ; London : Yale University Press, 2015. ,

References 

American women poets
Living people
21st-century American poets
21st-century American women writers
Poets from Alabama
Sarah Lawrence College alumni
University of North Carolina at Greensboro alumni
National Endowment for the Arts Fellows
Yale Younger Poets winners
Year of birth missing (living people)